was a Japanese painter. He was the son of Kanō Tan'yū by his second wife, and led the Kajibashi branch of the Kanō school after 1674. Stylistically he was known for his Tosa-like (of the competing Tosa school), but more so his slight breaking away from the copycatting style of Kanō school masters that became a large  critical argument in the rebellious anti-Kanō school movement of late Edo period. Parallel anti-Kanō school artist Hanabusa Itchō commended Tanshin on having "rare talent" derived from his ability to apply nature as a model. Itchō asserts Tanshin became a true artist by capturing the spirit of the bamboo to convey an idea.

References 

 The British Museum
 Museum of Fine Arts, Boston
 ArtFinder

1653 births
1718 deaths
17th-century Japanese painters
18th-century Japanese painters
Kanō school